The Only Good Indians is a 2020 horror novel by Stephen Graham Jones. It was first published on July 14, 2020 through Saga Press and Titan Books.

Plot
A Blackfeet man named Ricky leaves a bar to urinate outside and catches an elk stumbling into several cars in the parking lot, damaging them. Ricky tries to calm the elk but is caught outside with the damaged cars by the white bargoers. He is chased by them into a field, at which point he sees the reflections of the eyes of a herd of elk. Ricky is beaten to death.

The story then moves to Lewis, one of Ricky's childhood friends who has likewise moved off their reservation. Lewis is married to a white woman named Peta and works as a postal worker. One night while fixing a light, Lewis sees the image of a dead elk on the floor below and almost falls to his death, but is saved by Peta at the last moment. Lewis begins to shamefully reminisce on an event from his adolescence involving an elk and seeks to cause the vision to repeat by marking out the shape of the elk on his floor. He is helped by his coworker Shaney, a Crow woman who makes him uncomfortable due to their white coworkers projecting a romance onto them. Over several days, Lewis catches more glimpses of the elk and conveys his story to Shaney and Peta. As a teenager, Lewis and Ricky and their friends Gabe and Cass pursued a herd of elk into the elders' section of the reservation, where they were not legally or traditionally allowed to hunt. In the story, the boys kill several elk and rush to field dress them. Lewis is disturbed that the elk he shot, a young female, has not died. Lewis shoots the elk again. Upon dressing it, Lewis is horrified to find it is pregnant. He removes the fetus and buries it. He commits to using every portion of the mother elk and giving her meat away to the elders of the reservation. When returning to their truck, the boys are stopped by the game warden and made to dispose of the elk carvings.

Back in the present, Lewis becomes suspicious of Shaney's behavior and is convinced she is the elk spirit when his wife finds his dog stomped to death. He engineers an accident that kills Shaney. He tries to confirm she is the elk spirit but is not able to. He startles his wife, who is working on the same light he was earlier, and she falls to her death when Lewis does not intervene the way she did. He tries to determine if Peta was actually the elk spirit and is again unable to, but then notices that she appears to be pregnant. He cuts out an elk calf and flees with it, then is shot to death by the manhunt formed over the deaths and mutilations of Shaney and Peta.

The perspective of the elk spirit, Po'noka, is given. She is seeking to kill all of the friends to avenge her herd and her calf. She is rapidly growing into a human-appearing woman and hitchhikes back to the reservation.

Cass and Gabe are preparing for a sweat lodge ceremony to be hosted at Cass' place. Cass is getting ready to propose to his Crow girlfriend, Jo. She has helped him stay sober and employed. Gabe is not sober and is barred from attending his daughter Denorah's basketball games due to his behavior. Denorah is an up-and-coming star on the court. Before the sweat, Gabe stops by and makes a bet with Denorah over free throws, which she wins. Cass and Gabe begin the sweat with Nathan Yellow Tail, the son of Victor, a local cop. Victor will be responsible for maintaining their ceremony's stones. Nathan is heading down a bad path and Victor is hoping the sweat will straighten him out. During the course of the night, Victor sees the elk headed woman and she kills him. Gabe leaves the lodge to pee and finds Cass' dogs bludgeoned to death. He doesn't want to deal with it so leaves them and doesn't say anything when he returns to the sweat. However, he brings with him a thermos he found in the back of his truck. It turns out to be the thermos Cass keeps his money and engagement ring in, leading to a violent conflict between Cass and Gabe. Trying to make a point, Gabe rocks Cass' fixer-upper off its cinderblocks, unaware that Cass' girlfriend Jo is hiding underneath. Her death causes Cass to grab a rifle to shoot Gabe, but he only nicks Gabe and instead hits someone they think to be Denorah, arrived to collect her bet's profits. Cass allows Gabe to beat him to death over killing his daughter. Gabe discovers that Cass had actually shot Nathan, who is not dead. Gabe and Nathan see the elk headed woman. Nathan is trampled by horses trying to escape. Gabe speaks briefly with the elk headed woman, agreeing to kill himself if she spares Denorah. Once he has shot himself, she acknowledges that she plans to kill Denorah anyway, as she is Gabe's calf.

Denorah arrives at the site of the sweat and meets the elk headed woman disguised as Shaney. She tells Denorah the men are rounding up the dogs on the horses to explain their absence. The two play a game of basketball, during which Denorah becomes increasingly suspicious. Eventually the elk headed woman is injured and cannot hide her nature any longer. She pursues Denorah relentlessly through the snowy wilderness. Denorah encounters Nathan extremely wounded on one of the horses and sends him back to town to alert people who can rescue her. At the end of her endurance, Denorah stumbles into a clearing of elk bones. She realizes it is the site of the elk massacre, which her father was never willing to tell her about. She only knows of it from her stepfather. The elk headed woman finds where Lewis buried her calf and from the ground births a living calf. Denorah's stepfather arrives to save her—he is the game warden who interrupted the hunt and knew where to find them. Denorah stays his hand from killing the elk headed woman, who sheds her humanity and retreats into the wilderness with her calf.

Development 
Jones stated that the idea for The Only Good Indians likely began to develop while he and his wife were renting a home in Gunbarrel, Colorado. He also believes that the genesis of the book may have been from an event in his childhood, where his uncle stopped him from hunting a mother grizzly bear.

Jones has noted that the novel was somewhat of a departure from his normal writings, a process that he enjoyed, and that the book "came in three parts". He found writing on hunting to be the biggest challenge as he can "fake it on cars and fake it on people, but I have to get it right for the hunters.”

Release
The Only Good Indians was published in hardback and e-book formats on July 14, 2020 through Saga Press. An audiobook adaptation narrated by Shaun Taylor-Corbett was released simultaneously through Simon & Schuster Audio. The novel was also released in the United Kingdom through Titan Books on July 21, 2020.

Reception 
The novel received reviews from outlets such as the Washington Post and Los Angeles Times, the latter of which wrote that the novel "strains to weave a horror story with robust character studies. In the end, there is enough in each strand to appeal to both the genre fan and the literary reader, even if neither is fully reconciled to the other." NPR praised Jones as "one of the best writers working today regardless of genre" and stating that "Besides the creeping horror and gory poetry, The Only Good Indians does a lot in terms of illuminating Native American life from the inside, offering insights into how old traditions and modern living collide in contemporary life."

Accolades

References

External links 
 

2020s horror novels
Novels by Stephen Graham Jones
2020 American novels
Bram Stoker Award for Novel winners
Saga Press books